Scardovia is a genus of bacteria in the family Bifidobacteriaceae.

References

Bacteria genera
Bifidobacteriales